Maria Johanna Elselina Versfelt (27 September 1776 – 19 May 1845), also known as Ida Saint-Elme, Elzelina av Aylde Jonghe, and by her pseudonym La Contemporaine, was a Dutch writer and stage actress, known for her adventurous life with the armies of revolutionary France and Napoleon and her travels in Egypt and the Mediterranean, described in her best-selling books, and for "possibly the earliest satirical magazine written, illustrated, and published by a woman."

Versfelt was born in Lith.  Her parents were the vicar Gerrit Versfelt (1735–1781) and Alida de Jongh (1738–1828), and she was married around 1792–1796 to merchant Ringeling Claasz (1768–1801). She was known for her love affairs: by the age of 19 she had run away from her husband, had her first affair with a French officer, and was the wildly extravagant young mistress of French General Jean Victor Marie Moreau (1763–1813), with whom she had an affair from 1795 to 1799.

She left the Netherlands after the French conquest in 1795 and followed her lovers on their military campaigns over Europe. The love of her life was General Michel Ney, later Marshal of France. The French writer Jehan d'Ivray describes how Versfelt "adored" Ney, and was "constantly" at his side, often dressed in men's clothing because this made it easier for her to ride on horseback. In the battle of Eylau she "fought as a soldier" and was "badly wounded by an enemy lance." She "took part in the battle of Moscow" and the disastrous retreat of the French army from Russia in 1812. Her stormy relationship with Ney eventually broke up, and she later accompanied another French officer who went with Napoleon into exile on the island of Elba. Before Ney was executed in 1815, Versfelt tried desperately to see him one last time, and watched over his body in a night-long vigil after his death. After 1801, she also worked as an actress in traveling theatres in France and Italy.

She published her memoirs in 8 parts from 1827 to 1828, Mémoires d'une Contemporaine, which made her famous. This was one of the classic 'kiss and tell' books of the 19th century. The front piece of the book showed a marble sculpture of Versfelt "representing her at the age of 19, lying naked on an ancient Greco-Roman bed." In the words of one outraged reviewer, she was the "indiscreet and immoral confidante of the men of the Directoire, the Empire and even the Restoration… and from each of these personalities, as a skillful courtesan, she had known how to extract things which should have died with the man and gone with him to his tomb." The French writer Jehan d'Ivray recounts that Versfelt told the story of how the great French diplomat and Minister of finance Talleyrand used thousand franc bills to roll locks of her hair into curls one night, while she pointed out to him the ones he had missed. The book was an instant bestseller in France.

In 1831 Versfelt published her second book, La Contemporaine en Egypte, an account of her travels through France, Egypt, and the Mediterranean. "Give me the great highway, the pleasures and dangers of the road!" she says. Her trip is remarkable when we realize that she was more than 50 years old, and travel to Egypt in the 1820s was not easy. She is graciously thankful to the people who are nice to her and those she finds admirable, but she roasts with exquisite sarcasm those whom she finds ungracious, sanctimonious bigoted or unkind. She tempts her audience with veiled descriptions of the sexual attraction she feels for a traveling companion who is twenty years younger. Although Versfelt is clearly a French nationalist and a Bonapartist, this book often seems to go against the colonialist consensus: It presents very sympathetic portraits of Egyptians and Turks, appalling descriptions of the misery of the Egyptian people, and bitter criticism of the European community in Egypt and the flood of Europeans whom she sees arriving, "adventurers, swindlers and people with no talent whatsoever." After further travels around the Mediterranean, Versfelt managed to get onto an official French government ship on which she returned in triumph to Marseille, where her editor was waiting.

Versfelt tried to repeat her success again in London with "possibly the earliest satirical magazine written, illustrated and published by a woman," according to an entry in the Princeton University graphic arts acquisitions catalogue it was called La Caricature francaise. Journal sans abonnees et sans collaborateurs (French caricature. A journal without subscribers and without collaborators). It was published in London to avoid censorship in France. However, when Versfelt published embarrassing letters supposedly written by King Louis Philippe of France, she was prosecuted for libel. She was not convicted because "the court could not prove that the published letters were actually falsified."

She died, aged 68, in Brussels, in the almshouse of the Ursuline sisters.

References

External links
 
 

1776 births
1845 deaths
19th-century Dutch actresses
19th-century Dutch women writers
Dutch people of the Napoleonic Wars
Dutch stage actresses
Dutch memoirists
People from Oss
19th-century Dutch writers
Women memoirists
Pseudonymous women writers
19th-century pseudonymous writers